Taung Pyinthe (lit. "Queen of the Southern Palace") was the Chief queen consort of kings Saw Rahan II and Kunhsaw Kyaunghpyu of the Pagan Dynasty of Myanmar. She was also the mother of King Kyiso.

According to the royal chronicles, she was of royal descent and the eldest of three sisters. She and her two sisters were married off to King Saw Rahan. Her two younger sisters became known as Myauk Pyinthe ("Queen of the Northern Palace") and Ale Pyinthe ("Queen of the Central Palace") while she received the title, Taung Pyinthe ("Queen of the Southern Palace").

References

Bibliography
 
 

Chief queens consort of Pagan
11th-century Burmese women
10th-century Burmese women